Sorcerer (1977) is the ninth major release and first soundtrack album by the German band Tangerine Dream. It is the soundtrack for the film Sorcerer. It reached No.25 on the UK Albums Chart in a 7-week run, to become Tangerine Dream's third highest-charting album in the UK.

Track listing

Personnel
 Edgar Froese – Fender Stratocaster, Gibson Les Paul Custom Guitars, Twin Keyboard Mellotron Mark V, Steinway Grand Piano, Oberheim Polyphonic Synthesizer, ARP Omni string synthesizer, PPG Synthesizer, Modified Moog synthesizer.
 Christopher Franke – Moog modular synthesizer, Projekt Elektronik sequencer, Computerstudio Digital Sequencer, Mellotron, ARP Pro Soloist synthesizer, Elka String Synthesizer, Oberheim sequencer.
 Peter Baumann – Projekt Elektronik Modular Synthesizer, Projekt Elektronik Sequencer, Fender Rhodes Piano, ARP Pro Soloist synthesizer, Mellotron.

Singles

References

1977 soundtrack albums
Tangerine Dream soundtracks
MCA Records soundtracks
Space music albums
Adventure film soundtracks
Drama film soundtracks
Thriller film soundtracks